Calibri is a digital sans-serif typeface family in the humanist or modern style. It was designed by Luc(as) de Groot in 2002–2004 and released to the general public in 2007, with Microsoft Office 2007 and Windows Vista. In Office 2007, it replaced Times New Roman as the default typeface in Word and replaced Arial as the default in PowerPoint, Excel, Outlook, and WordPad. De Groot described its subtly rounded design as having "a warm and soft character".

Calibri is part of the ClearType Font Collection, a suite of fonts from various designers released with Windows Vista. All start with the letter C to reflect that they were designed to work well with Microsoft's ClearType text rendering system, a text rendering engine designed to make text clearer to read on liquid-crystal display monitors. The other fonts in the same group are Cambria, Candara, Consolas, Constantia and Corbel.

Characteristics
Calibri features subtly rounded stems and corners that are visible at larger sizes. Its sloped form is a "true italic" with handwriting influences, which are seen in many modern sans-serif typefaces.

The typeface includes characters from Latin, Latin extended, Greek, and Cyrillic scripts. Calibri makes extensive use of sophisticated OpenType formatting; it features a range of ligatures as well as lining and text figures, indices (numbers enclosed by circles) up to 20, and an alternate f and g accessible by enabling the fourth and fifth stylistic sets. Some features in Calibri remain unsupported by Office, including true small caps, all-caps spacing, superscript and subscript glyphs and the ability to create arbitrary fractions; these may be accessed using programs such as Adobe InDesign.

One potential source of confusion in Calibri is a visible homoglyph, a pair of easily confused characters: the lowercase letter L and the uppercase letter i (l and I) of the Latin script are effectively indistinguishable; this is true of many other common fonts, however.

The design has similarities to de Groot's much more extensive TheSans family (a humanist font) and shares similarities with humanist fonts, although this has straight ends rather than rounding.

, a Hebrew alphabet version is in development.  De Groot has also said in 2016 that he would like if possible to add Bulgarian alphabet variant letterforms at a later date.

Availability

Calibri is the default typeface of Microsoft Office and much other Microsoft software. Joe Friend, a program manager on Word for Office 2007's release, explained that the decision to switch to Calibri was caused by a desire to make the default font one optimised towards onscreen display: "We believed that more and more documents would never be printed but would solely be consumed on a digital device", and to achieve a "modern look".

Because of the long development of Windows Vista, Calibri's development – from 2002 to 2005 – occurred several years before the release of that OS. It was first presented in a 2005 beta of Windows Vista, then codenamed Longhorn, and first became available for use with the Beta 2 version of Office 2007, released on 23 May 2006. Calibri and the rest of the ClearType Font Collection were finally released to the general public on 30 January 2007, since when it has been released with most Microsoft software environments.

Calibri is also distributed with Excel Viewer, PowerPoint Viewer, the Microsoft Office Compatibility Pack for Windows, and the Open XML File Format Converter for Mac. For use in other operating systems and web apps, a license may be obtained from Ascender Corporation and its parent company Monotype Imaging.

The Calibri Light font was introduced in Windows 8 and was retrospectively added to Windows 7 and Windows Server 2008 R2 as part of a software update. Starting with Microsoft Office 2013, Calibri Light is the default font for PowerPoint presentations and Word headings.

In 2013, Google released a freely-licensed font called Carlito, which is metric-compatible to Calibri, as part of ChromeOS. Carlito's metric-compatibility ensures ChromeOS users can correctly display and print a document designed in Calibri without disrupting its layout. Carlito’s glyph shapes are based on the prior open-source typeface Lato.

On 28 April 2021, Microsoft announced they would be replacing Calibri with a new default font across Microsoft products.

Awards
Calibri won the TDC2 2005 award from the Type Directors Club under the Type System category. The Arabic typeface of Calibri won the 2nd Award of GRANSHAN 2016.

In crime and politics
Because of Calibri's position as the default font in Office, many cases have been reported in which documents were shown to be forged thanks to a purported creation date before Calibri was available to the general public.

In 2017, the font came to public attention as evidence in the Pakistani government-related "Panama Papers" case (also known as Fontgate), in which a document provided by Maryam Nawaz (daughter of ex-PM Nawaz Sharif) supposedly signed in February 2006 was found to be typed up in Calibri. De Groot said that there was "really zero chance" that the document was genuine.

In 2023, the United States Department of State retired Times New Roman in favor of Calibri for official communications and documents.

References

External links
 

Typefaces and fonts introduced in 2007
Microsoft typefaces
Humanist sans-serif typefaces
Windows Vista typefaces
IPA typefaces
Typefaces with text figures
Digital typefaces
Typefaces designed by Luc(as) de Groot
ClearType Font Collection